Alphonse de Créquy, Comte de Canaples (died 1711), was a French aristocrat who became a close friend of King Charles II of England.

Biography
Alphonse de Créquy was the second son of Charles II de Créquy, seigneur de Canaple (who was the younger son of Charles I de Blanchefort, Marquis de Créquy a Marshal of France).

In 1702 when the line of his elder brother Charles III de Créquy (1623?–1687) became extinct, de Créquy inherited the title Duc de Lesdiguires, and also eventually succeeded also to the honours of his younger brother François de Créquy (1625–1687).

De Créquy had not the talent of his brothers, and lost his various appointments in France. He went to London in 1672, where he became closely allied with Charles de Saint-Évremond, and was one of the intimates of King Charles II.

References

Attribution:
 Endnote:
For a detailed genealogy of the family and its alliances see Louis Moréri, Dictionnaire historique: Annuaire de la noblesse française (1856 and 1867).

1711 deaths
Year of birth unknown
Alphonse